Mill Creek is a creek in Tulare County, California. It is a distributary of the Kaweah River.  It is one of the four main creeks that flow through the city of Visalia.

History
Mill Creek was named after Dr. Mathew's grist mill.

In 1910, Mill Creek, was lined with cement and covered.  Roads and buildings were constructed over it and about one-third of a mile of Mill Creek flows below the surface today.  The lining and covering of Mill Creek was predicted by some to be the answer to the flooding problem, but flooding continued.

The city of Visalia was built on the banks of Mill Creek.  Today, part of the creek that flows through Downtown is underground, enclosed by a concrete conduit.  There are plans to resurface the creek.

See also
Cameron Creek
Packwood Creek
St. John's River (California)

References

Geography of Visalia, California
Rivers of Tulare County, California
Rivers of Northern California